Marc Schnier (born February 7, 1991) is a German footballer who plays for SC Hessen Dreieich.

External links

Marc Schnier at Fupa

1991 births
Living people
German footballers
SV Darmstadt 98 players
Borussia Dortmund II players
3. Liga players
Hammer SpVg players
Association football midfielders
SC Hessen Dreieich players
Sportspeople from Hamm
Footballers from North Rhine-Westphalia